Sati is a Bengali film released in 1989 written and directed by Aparna Sen. Based on a story by Kamal Kumar Majumdar, the film is about mute orphan girl who is married to a Banyan tree because her horoscope suggests that she would be a sati, and her husband would die. The film had Shabana Azmi and Arun Banerjee in lead roles.

Along with her previous films, Parama (1984), Aparna Sen became the first female director in Bengali cinema to explore gender issues and feminist perspective.

Synopsis  
The young Brahmin girl (Shabana Azmi) in this story has a disastrous horoscope. In an Indian village in 1828, this can be a real handicap. The fact that she is mute only compounds her difficulties. Her horoscope predicts that she will become a widow at an early age. If this turns out as predicted, in addition to being bad luck for her prospective husbands, it is bad luck for her, as she will, according to the customs of the time, have to commit suttee, sati. That means she will have to be burned alive on her husband's funeral pyre. To avoid this fate, her family has hit upon the appealing strategem of having her marry a banyan tree.

Cast
 Shabana Azmi — Uma (Umi)
Arun Banerjee
 Kali Banerjee
 Pradip Mukherjee
 Arindam Ganguli 
 Shakuntala Barua
 Laboni Sarkar

References

External links

Sati (YouTube)

1989 films
Bengali-language Indian films
Films set in 1828
Films about women in India
Marriage in Hinduism
Films about disability in India
Indian historical films
1980s Bengali-language films
Films directed by Aparna Sen